José Mardoqueo Henríquez Dubón (born May 24, 1987) is a Salvadoran former footballer.  He was banned for life in 2013, for match-fixing while playing for the El Salvador national football team. He then played for Zeravani SC in the Iraqi Premier League, as that league is not governed by FIFA.

Club career
After coming through at Salvadoran second division side El Roble, Henríquez would go on to play in the first division for FAS for almost 7 years, dating back to September 2004 when he made his FAS debut against Municipal from Guatemala. In mid-2011, Henríquez left FAS and signed a two-year contract with Águila starting with the 2011/12 season. In July 2013 returned to Águila signing for 4 years.

In September 2014, thanks to the Iraqi Premier League not being recognised by FIFA, Henriquez and his fellow banned Salvadoran teammate Cristian Castillo joined Zeravani SC. Another fellow banned Salvadoran teammate Ramón Sánchez subsequently joined Zakho FC, the former club of fellow Salvadoran teammate Josué Flores, which also plays in the Iraqi Premier League.

International career
Henríquez made his debut for El Salvador in an October 2006 friendly match against Panama and has represented his country at the 2007 and 2009 and 2013 CONCACAF Gold Cup CONCACAF Gold Cups, in addition to six 2010 FIFA World Cup qualifying games for Los Cuscatlecos.

On September 20, 2013, Henríquez was one of 14 Salvadoran players banned for life due to their involvement with match fixing.

References

External links
 El Grafico Profile 
 

1987 births
Living people
People from Cabañas Department
Association football defenders
Salvadoran footballers
El Salvador international footballers
2007 CONCACAF Gold Cup players
2009 CONCACAF Gold Cup players
2011 Copa Centroamericana players
2013 Copa Centroamericana players
2013 CONCACAF Gold Cup players
C.D. FAS footballers
C.D. Águila footballers
Sportspeople involved in betting scandals
Sportspeople banned for life
Salvadoran expatriate sportspeople in Iraq
Expatriate footballers in Iraq
Salvadoran expatriate footballers